(S)-2,3-Oxidosqualene ((S)-2,3-epoxysqualene) is an intermediate in the synthesis of the cell membrane sterol precursors lanosterol and cycloartenol, as well as saponins.  It is formed when squalene is oxidized by the enzyme squalene monooxygenase.  2,3-Oxidosqualene is the substrate of various oxidosqualene cyclases, including lanosterol synthase, which produces lanosterol, a precursor to cholesterol.

The stereoisomer 2,3-(R)-oxidosqualene is an inhibitor of lanosterol synthase.

References

External links 
 Oxidosqualene cyclase, PDB December 2007 Molecule of the Month

Epoxides
Triterpenes